Veer Surendra Sai Stadium is a cricket stadium in Sambalpur, Orissa. The ground is named after Surendra Sai, an Indian freedom fighter who died fighting the British. The ground hosted cricket matches from 1973. Till date ground has hosted 15 first-class matches. The ground has hosted at least one match since 2008 for Odisha cricket team. The ground hosted two List A matches in 1992 and 1999 both for East Zone.

References

External links
Cricinfo profile
Cricketarchive.com

Multi-purpose stadiums in India
Cricket grounds in Odisha
Buildings and structures in Sambalpur
Sports venues completed in 1973
1973 establishments in Orissa
20th-century architecture in India